Mohamed Fathy is an Egyptian football player who plays as a defensive midfielder for Pyramids FC since 2018. He was called to the Egypt national football team by Héctor Cúper for the match against Uganda for the 2018 FIFA World Cup qualification.

References

Living people
1994 births
Egyptian footballers
Association football midfielders
Ismaily SC players
Pyramids FC players
Egyptian Premier League players